Mohammad Javad Fathi is an Iranian academic, lawyer and reformist politician who is member of the Parliament of Iran representing Tehran, Rey, Shemiranat and Eslamshahr electoral district. He resigned on 25 June 2018, saying that he has no hope for change in the current system.

Career 
Fathi is a professor of University of Tehran in law.

Electoral history

References

1965 births
Living people
Members of the 10th Islamic Consultative Assembly
20th-century Iranian lawyers
21st-century Iranian lawyers
Iranian reformists
Academic staff of the University of Tehran
Volunteer Basij personnel of the Iran–Iraq War
People from Khuzestan Province